Nearest to Heaven is a 2002 French-Spanish-Canadian romantic drama film directed by Tonie Marshall and starring Catherine Deneuve and William Hurt.

Cast
Catherine Deneuve as Fanette
William Hurt as Matt
Bernard Le Coq as Bernard
Hélène Fillières as Lucie
Patrice Chéreau as Pierre
Nathalie Richard as Brigitte
Gilbert Melki as Alain
Emmanuelle Devos as Jeune femme cinéma
Noémie Godin-Vigneau as Carole
Paulina Porizkova as Mary Rafelson
François Arnal as Himself

References

External links
 
 

2000s English-language films
2000s French-language films
French romantic drama films
Canadian romantic drama films
Spanish romantic drama films
2002 romantic drama films
2000s Canadian films
2000s French films